is a multi-use stadium in Sapporo, Japan.  It is currently used mostly for football matches. It serves as a home ground of Hokkaido Consadole Sapporo in addition to the Sapporo Dome. The stadium holds 20,005 people and was built in 1980.

External links 
Official website

Football venues in Japan
Athletics (track and field) venues in Japan
Hokkaido Consadole Sapporo
Sports venues in Sapporo